Matthew "Matt" Sanchez (born December 1, 1970) is an American journalist, who has worked for Fox News and other organizations. He previously served as a Marine reservist, and was involved in a controversy about access to campus for military recruiters at Columbia University. In March 2007, Sanchez was awarded the first "Jeane Kirkpatrick Academic Freedom Award" at the Conservative Political Action Conference. In the early 90s, Sanchez performed in gay pornographic films as Pierre LaBranche and Rod Majors. He was involved in the Scott Thomas Beauchamp controversy, as a source.

Marine Corps service and inquiries

In 2003, Sanchez joined the United States Marine Corps and was trained as a refrigeration mechanic with the rank of corporal.
On March 16, 2007, John Hoellwarth, a staff writer for Military Times Media Group, reported that Sanchez was the subject of a Marine Corps inquiry about his appearances in gay pornographic videos and related allegations.
Of concern was whether "Sanchez had enlisted prior to the end of his film career," "if Reserve Marines were prohibited from doing porn when not in a drilling status," and "how the current 'don't ask, don't tell' policy might apply."

In an article published April 1, 2007 by the Marine Corps Times, Hoellwarth wrote that the Marine Corps was also investigating reports that Sanchez had "wrongfully solicited funds to support [his] purported deployment to Iraq." According to the article, a Marine investigator accused Sanchez of "coordinating a $300 payment from the New York City United War Veterans Council and $12,000 from U-Haul."
Sanchez told the newspaper that the charges were "demonstrably false,"  and that he never collected any funds from the listed organizations.

Political activism at Columbia University
In 2005, while a junior at the Columbia University School of General Studies,
Sanchez said he was harassed by students during the Fall 2005 "Activities Day" while manning the table for the Columbia Military Society. According to Sanchez, he was approached by members of the International Socialist Organization (a Trotskyite organization), an anti-war campus group who told him he was stupid for serving in the military.  According to Mark Xue, president of the military society who was at the table with Sanchez, "They were telling him that he was stupid and ignorant, that he was being brainwashed and used for being a minority in the military."
Sanchez made a series of formal complaints to the university, which upon investigation found no grounds for punishing the three accused students.
The accused dispute Sanchez's account of the events. In a Columbia Daily Spectator editorial, "The Conservative Witch Hunt," Zach Zill wrote that while he did make clear that he found on-campus military recruitment offensive, he had done so without the use of epithets and derogatory language.
Monique Dols, another of the accused Trotskyites, stated the complaint was false and "a discrediting campaign against us."

Sanchez and others in the student group MilVets, an organization for on-campus veterans, had also voiced their frustration at what they perceived to be a lack of regard for veterans on the campus. In February 2006, the university amended its non-discrimination policy to include "military status" for protection from harassment. According to the University, this was not a policy change, but merely a "semantic clarification," as the words "military status" replaced "disabled or Vietnam era veteran."

Media coverage and CPAC
On December 4, 2006, Sanchez wrote an opinion piece for the New York Post, titled,
"Diversity Double-Talk: Ivy's 'Inclusion' excludes Military," which led to his being invited onto various conservative talk shows in January 2007 to discuss the incident.

On March 2, 2007, Sanchez was awarded the Jeane Kirkpatrick Academic Freedom Award at the annual Conservative Political Action Conference (CPAC). A featured speaker at the conference, Ann Coulter, made controversial remarks at the event, indirectly referring to presidential candidate John Edwards as a "faggot". In an article for Salon.com, Sanchez discussed how a photograph of him taken at the conference with Coulter brought him to the attention of bloggers, one of whom recognized him as a former pornographic gay film star. In the same article, Sanchez stated that bloggers had compared him to Rich Merritt, author of Secrets of a Gay Marine Porn Star, and Jeff Gannon, a conservative journalist who was outed as a gay escort.

Commentary
Matt Sanchez provided commentary and reports for WorldNetDaily and Foxnews.com, including as an embedded reporter in Afghanistan. His work has appeared in the National Review Online, The Weekly Standard, and Human Events.

Sanchez was a source associated with criticism of Scott Beauchamp's "Baghdad Diarist" writings which appeared in The New Republic.
The story became nationally known when military bloggers (milbloggers) and Weekly Standard editor Michael Goldfarb raised doubt about the validity of the reports of the "Baghdad Diarist".

Selected filmography
In the early 1990s, Sanchez performed in gay pornographic movies, appearing as Pierre La Branche and Rod Majors.  However, in a 2007 interview, Sanchez commented that "I don't like porn, it reduces the mind, flattens the soul" and that he considers his pornographic career an identity outgrown.

References

External links

 

1970 births
American bloggers
American male pornographic film actors
Activists from California
Columbia University School of General Studies alumni
Living people
American actors in gay pornographic films
People from San Jose, California
United States Marines
American LGBT military personnel
American male journalists
American LGBT journalists
American gay writers
LGBT pornographic film actors
LGBT people from California
Pornographic film actors from California
Journalists from California
21st-century American non-fiction writers
American male bloggers